Pathna is a location in the Pathna CD block in the Rajmahal subdivision of the Sahibganj district in the Indian state of Jharkhand.

Geography

Location                                         

Pathna is not identified in 2011 census as a separate place. In the map of Pathna CD block on page 129 of  the District Census Handbook 2011, Sahibganj, Pathna is marked as headquarters of the CD block but the maps in the Jharkhand census handbooks are so unclear that the mouza/ village it is located in cannot be identified. (Anybody can check the map as given in the reference and if the mouza/ village can be identified, it can be recorded here.)

Overview
Rajmahal coalfield is shown in the map. The entire area is overwhelmingly rural with only small pockets of urbanisation.

Note: The full screen map is interesting. All places marked on the map are linked and you can easily move on to another page of your choice. Enlarge the map to see what else is there – one gets railway links, many more road links and so on.

Civic administration

CD block HQ
Headquarters of this CD block is at Pathna location.

Education
Model School Pathna is an English-medium coeducational institution established in 2012. It has facilities for teaching from class VI to class XII.

Bohra Sita Annapurna Inter Mahila College Pathna is a girls only institution established in 1981. It has facilities for teaching in classes XI and XII.

Project Girls High School Pathna is a Hindi-medium girls only (NOT coeducational as the name clearly suggests) institution established in 2000. It has facilities for teaching from class VIII to class X.

References

Villages in Sahibganj district